Metal Industries, Limited was a conglomerate of mostly British engineering companies. It was founded in Glasgow in 1922 by Robert Watson McCrone. In 1953 its activities were described as "electrical and mechanical engineering manufacture and metal trading" In 1967, Aberdare Holdings of South Wales acquired a controlling interest in the group, but was quickly thwarted when M.I. created a large tranche of new shares which it sold to Thorn Electrical Industries, giving Thorn overall control of the company. The City Panel on Takeovers and Mergers referred to "abuses and inequities" that occurred during this chaotic takeover, among others at the time, but declined to recommend tougher regulations.
A  good history of the company's shipbreaking activities was published by the World Ship Society in 1992 in Ian Buxton's "Metal Industries: Shipbreaking at Rosyth and Charlestown".

The subsidiary companies continued to trade as the 'Metal Industries' group of Thorn until 1970, when it merged with the George Cohen 600 group to become Six Hundred Metal Holdings. In 1976, Thorn sold its interest in the group to the government-owned British Steel Corporation.

Timeline of acquisitions, mergers, sales and closures 
 1922: Formed as Alloa Shipbreaking Co., Rosyth & Charlestown
 October 1926: Purchased Rosyth Shipbreaking Co. and gained their leases at HM Dockyard, Rosyth
 1932: Sale of oxygen business to British Oxygen Company
 1935: Metal Industries, Limited converted to public company
 1940: Acquisition of Electrical Switchgear and Associated Industries Ltd. and its subsidiary Brookhirst Switchgear Ltd., Chester
 1941: Sentinel Waggon Works (1936) Limited 
 1942: Igranic Electric Co., Bedford 
 1945: Sentinel Waggon Works renamed to Sentinel (Shrewsbury) Limited
 1946: Reorganisation: Metal Industries (Electrical Group) Limited set up to organise all electrical business; Metal Industries (Salvage) Ltd., Faslane, to take over salvage business; Sentinel (Shrewsbury) Limited to run engineering business; Metal Industries, Ltd. to become holding company
 1947: Ferrous Light Castings, Warrington (completion of acquisition)
 1948: Fawcett  Preston & Co. Ltd., Bromborough (founded 1758)
 1948: Cantle Switches Ltd. (closed 1958)
 1949: John Allan & Co. (Glenpark) Ltd. (est. 1898)
 1949: Cox and Danks Ltd. (see Ernest Cox)
 1952 or earlier: Hughes Bolckow Shipbreaking Company Limited, Blyth
 1955: Formation of Metind Limited
 1955: Acquisition of resistor business from the Rheostatic Company
 1955: Acquisition of Finney Presses Ltd.
 1956: Sale of Sentinel (Shrewsbury) Limited to Rolls-Royce
 1957 or earlier: Shipbreaking Industries Limited
 1957: Closure of Metind Limited
 1959: Merger of Igranic with Brookhirst
 1958: Merger of Finney Presses Limited, Birmingham with Fawcett Preston
 1958: Sale of British Oxygen Company Limited 
 1958: Farmer Brothers (Shifnal) Limited
 1959: Avo Ltd. and subsidiary Taylor Electrical Instruments Limited
 1959: Olaer France S.A., Paris
 1959: Towler Brothers (Patents) Limited
 May 1959: International Rectifier Co. (Great Britain) Limited, at Oxted, Surrey, joint-owned with International Rectifier of California
 1960: Lancashire Dynamo Group, including:
 Lancashire Dynamo Nevelin, Oxted
 Lancashire Dynamo & Crypto, Trafford Park (sold to A.E.I., 1967)
 Lancashire Dynamo Electronic Products
 Foster Transformers, Wimbledon & Leatherhead
 J. G. Statter & Co., Amersham
 1961 or earlier: New Eagle Foundry, Birmingham
 1961 or earlier: Cable Jointers, Crypton Equipment, Dynamo & Motor Repairs, Minerva Mouldings
 1961 or earlier: Metal Industries (Europe) S.A.
 1961: Closure of Metal Industries (Salvage) Limited
 1963: M.I. (South Africa) (Pty.), renamed from Brookhirst Igranic South Africa (Pty.)
 1963 or earlier: Dominion M.I. Limited, Montreal
 1964 or earlier: Mattel-Marden Limited (joint owned)
 1964: Acquisition of 50% of International Rectifier Corporation Italiana S.p.A.
 1965: Acquisition of 50% of International Rectifier Europe S.A.
 1966: Industrial Automation Controls Ltd. (set up to coordinate Brookhirst Igranic and Lancashire Dynamo Electronic Products)
 1966: Disposal of Fawcett Preston
 Aug 1967: Acquired by Thorn
 1970: Merged into Six Hundred Metal Holdings

Chairmen 
 1922-1951: J Donald Pollock
 1952-1955: Robert Watson McCrone
 1955: J S Hutchison
 1956-1964: Charles Westlake
 1965-? Alexander I. McKenzie

Notable salvage operations 
 1934: , Scapa Flow
 1935: , Scapa Flow
 1936: , Scapa Flow
 1937: , Scapa Flow
 1938: , Scapa Flow
 1939: , Scapa Flow
 1947: , Scapa Flow
 1952: , Pentland Firth
 1952: , Ailsa Craig
 1957: Lona, Hull
 1957: Suez Canal

References

Bibliography

Engineering companies of the United Kingdom
Ship breaking